Pope Callixtus II (r. 1119–24) created 35 cardinals in eight consistories held throughout his pontificate. This included one future successor (Lucius II) and two future antipopes (Celestine II and Victor IV).

1119
 Gregorio Albergati

January 1120
 
 Roberto
 Adoaldo
 Etienne de Bar
 Pons de Melgueil O.S.B. Clun.
 Baialardo

December 1120
 Gregorio
  Can. Reg. Lat.
 Stefano
 Gionata iuniore
 Gerardo
 Gualtiero
 Gregorio

1120
 Luigi Lucidi
 Atto

December 1121
 Gilles de Paris O.S.B. Clun.
 Roberto
 Pietro

1121
 Gregorio

December 1122
 
 Teobaldo Boccapecora
 Gerardo Caccianemici dell'Orso Can. Reg. S.M.R.
 
 Gregorio Conti
 Pietro Cariaceno
 Giovanni Dauferio
 Gregorio Tarquini
 Uberto
 Matteo
 Gregorio
 Angelo

1123
 Johannes
 Ugo Lectifredo

Notes and references

Sources

College of Cardinals
Callixtus II
12th-century cardinals
12th-century Catholicism
Pope Callixtus II